Hindutva pop is Indian pop music that promotes Hindutva or Hindu nationalist ideas. The music has become increasingly popular in the 2010s and 2020s, both online and offline, and frequently includes hateful lyrics targeting Muslims in India. 

One popular Hindutva song by Laxmi Dubey, “Har Ghar Bhagwa Chayega” (Every House Shall Turn Saffron), has been played more than 65 million times online. Hindutva pop music is especially popular within India’s cow belt, considered to be a Hindutva stronghold. The songs have sometimes been played on loudspeakers by Hindu mobs during violent attacks on Muslims.

References

Indian pop